Bedő is a village in Hajdú-Bihar County, in the Northern Great Plain region of eastern Hungary.

Geography

References

External links
http://www.geographic.org/geographic_names/name.php?uni=-1264696&fid=2322&c=hungary

Populated places in Hajdú-Bihar County
Romanian communities in Hungary